Richard Scheibe (19 April 1879, Chemnitz – 6 October 1964, Berlin) was a German artist primarily remembered as a sculptor. He trained as a painter, and taught himself to sculpt beginning in 1906. From 1925-1933 he taught at the Städelsches Kunstinstitut in Frankfurt am Main. He was dismissed from teaching when the Nazis seized power but was reinstated in 1934. He received various recognitions during the Third Reich, including the Goethe-Medaille für Kunst und Wissenschaft and placement on the Gottbegnadeten list. After World War II he continued to sculpt, including a figurative piece for the Memorial to the German Resistance. His work was also part of the sculpture event in the art competition at the 1928 Summer Olympics.

References

Sources
 Robert Thoms: Große Deutsche Kunstausstellung München 1937–1944. Index of artists in two volumes, volume II: Sculptors. Berlin 2011, .
 Ursel Berger. "Scheibe, Richard." In Grove Art Online. Oxford Art Online (accessed December 26, 2011; subscription required).

External links 
 
 Entry for Richard Scheibe on the Union List of Artist Names
 
 Critical essay on Scheibe with numerous illustrations (in German)

Commanders Crosses of the Order of Merit of the Federal Republic of Germany
People from Chemnitz
German sculptors
German male sculptors
1879 births
1964 deaths
20th-century sculptors
Olympic competitors in art competitions